Shetler is a surname. Notable people with the surname include:

 Anthony Shetler (born 1982), American skateboarder 
 Harriet Shetler (1917–2010), founder of the National Alliance on Mental Illness
 Norman Shetler (born 1931), pianist, puppeteer, and puppet constructor

See also
 Sheller